The 2018–19 Southern Utah Thunderbirds basketball team represented Southern Utah University during the 2018–19 NCAA Division I men's basketball season. The Thunderbirds were led by third-year head coach Todd Simon and played their home games at the America First Events Center in Cedar City, Utah as members of the Big Sky Conference. They finished the season 17–17, 9–11 in Big Sky play to finish in seventh place. They defeated Idaho State and Northern Colorado to advance to the semifinals of the Big Sky tournament where they lost to Eastern Washington. They were invited to the CollegeInsider.com Tournament where they defeated Drake in the first round before losing in the second round to Cal State Bakersfield.

Previous season
The Thunderbirds finished the 2017–18 season 13–19, 5–13 in Big Sky play to finish in tenth place. In the Big Sky tournament they defeated Idaho State and Idaho to advance to the semifinals where they lost to Eastern Washington.

Offseason

Departures

Incoming transfers

2018 recruiting class

Roster

Schedule and results 

|-
! colspan="9" style=| Exhibition

|-
! colspan="9" style=|Non-conference regular season

|-
! colspan="9" style=| Big Sky regular season

|-
! colspan="9" style=|Big Sky tournament

|-
!colspan=12 style=|CollegeInsider.com Postseason tournament
|-

References

2018-19 team
2018–19 Big Sky Conference men's basketball season
2019 in sports in Utah
2018 in sports in Utah
Southern Utah